Hibbertia striata is a species of flowering plant in the family Dilleniaceae and is endemic to the southwest of Western Australia. It is a spreading shrub with linear leaves and yellow flowers usually with thirty stamens arranged in five bundles around five glabrous carpels.

Description
Flowering mainly occurs from July to November.

Taxonomy
This species was first formally described in 1845 by Ernst Gottlieb von Steudel who gave it the name Candollea striata in Lehmann's Plantae Preissianae. In 2017, Kevin Thiele changed the name to Hibbertia striata in the journal Nuytsia. The specific epithet (striata) refers to the leaves.

Distribution and habitat
Hibbertia striata grows in woodland and forest and is widespread, mostly in the area between Morawa, Mingenew, Wongan Hills, York and Brookton in the Avon Wheatbelt, Geraldton Sandplains, Jarrah Forest and Swan Coastal Plain biogeographic regions of south-western Western Australia.

Conservation status
Hibbertia striata is classified as "not threatened" by the Government of Western Australia Department of Biodiversity, Conservation and Attractions.

See also
List of Hibbertia species

References

striata
Flora of Western Australia
Plants described in 1845
Taxa named by Ernst Gottlieb von Steudel